Gwalior Lok Sabha seat is one of the 29 Lok Sabha constituencies in the Indian state of Madhya Pradesh state. This constituency covers the entire Gwalior district and part of Shivpuri district.

Vidhan Sabha segments
Gwalior Lok Sabha constituency currently comprises the following eight Vidhan Sabha (Legislative Assembly) segments:

Members of Lok Sabha

 *By Election

Election results

2019 Lok Sabha Election

2014 Lok Sabha Election

2004 Lok Sabha Election

 Ramsevak Singh (Congress)  :  307,735  (Expelled from Lok Sabha)
 Jaibhan Singh Pawaiya (BJP) :  210,063
 Ram Sevak Singh was caught taking bribe and expelled from Lok Sabha. This necessitated by-election for the seat which BJP won.

2007 bye-election

1984 Lok Sabha Election
 Madhavrao Scindia (Congress)  :  307,735
 Atal Bihari Vajpayee (BJP) :  132,141

Political sources claim that Scindia had told Vajpayee that he would be contesting from Guna, but changed his seat very late. The sympathy wave for Congress was so strong that Vajpayee could have lost the election in any case, but Scindia's candidacy made his defeat certain. Jana Sangh / BJP had won this seat even in the Indira waves of 1971 and 1980.

1971 Lok Sabha Election
 Atal Bihari Vajpayee (BJP) : 188,995 
 Gautam Sharma (Congress)  :  118,685

1952 Lok Sabha Election
General Elections 1952
Vi Gha Deshpande (Hindu Mahasabha) won from both Gwalior and Guna. He retained Guna seat, and resigned from Gwalior. The by-election for Gwalior seat was won by N B Khare, also of Hindu Maha Sabha. In 1930s, Khare had been Chief Minister (called 'Premier' in those days) of Central Province as a Congress politician. But he left the party later.

References

Sources
Election Commission of India - Report

See also
 Gwalior district
 List of Constituencies of the Lok Sabha

Lok Sabha constituencies in Madhya Pradesh